Devy Erlih (Paris, 5 November 1928 – Paris, 7 February 2012) was a French violinist and the 1955 winner of the Long-Thibaud competition.

Background
Erlih was born in France in 1928 to first-generation immigrants to France from Bessarabia (now Moldova). His father was a folk musician who played the cimbalon and pan pipes. His parents made sure that he spoke only French so that he would not be known as an immigrant.

Bibliography

References

20th-century French Jews
1928 births
2012 deaths
Musicians from Paris
21st-century French male classical violinists
Jewish violinists
Long-Thibaud-Crespin Competition prize-winners
Conservatoire de Paris alumni
Academic staff of the Conservatoire de Paris
French people of Moldovan-Jewish descent